Gafargaon is an upazila of Mymensingh District in the Division of Mymensingh, Bangladesh.

Geography

It has 73,130 households and total area 401.16 km2.
Trishal on the north, Nandail in the east, Hossainpur and Pakundia upazilas of Kishoreganj district, Kapasia and Sreepur upazilas of Gazipur district on the south and Trishal and Bhaluka upazilas on the west. Nearly three sides of the border are surrounded by river Brahmaputra, Kalivana on the south and Sutia in the west. Just land on the north.

Demographics
According to the 2011 Bangladesh census, Gafargaon had a population of 430,746. Males constituted 48.90% of the population and females 51.10%. The density of the number of people 1,848 (per square kilometer). Annual population growth rate 1.30%. Total family (dan) 82,770. Muslims formed 98.49% of the population, Hindus 1.43% and others 0.08%. Gafargaon had a literacy rate of 49.26% for the population 7 years and above.

As of the 1991 Bangladesh census, Gafargaon has a population of 379,803. Males constitute 51.04% of the population, and females 48.96%. This Upazila's eighteen up population is 184,633. Gafargaon has an average literacy rate of 90.3% (7+ years), and the national average of 70.4% literate.

Economy

Cooperatives

Central Co-operative Society Ltd. 01,
Freedom Fighter Co-operative Society Ltd. 2,
Union multipurpose co-operative society Ltd. 15,
Multipurpose Co-operative Society Ltd. 109,
Fisheries Cooperative Society Ltd. 37,
Youth Co-operative Society Ltd.  11,
Asylum / Housing Multipurpose Cooperative Society 05,
Farmer Co-operative Society Ltd. 120,
Male Non-Cooperative Co-operative Society Ltd. 06,
Female Non-Exempt Co-operative Society Ltd. 07,
Small Business Co-operative Society Ltd. 2,
Other Cooperative Societies 05,
Driver Cooperative Association 3.

Land and revenue
Mouza 142,
Union Land Office 15,
Municipal land office 01,
Total khas land 1690.61 acres,
Agriculture 167.39 acres,
Non-agricultural 1523.22 acres,
Settlementable agriculture 14.71 acres (agricultural),
Annual land development tax (demand),
Common = 3860280 / -,
Agency = 1,88,04,747 / -,
Annual land development tax (realization),
General = Revenues in July 27, 312 / - July,
Agency = No income in July,
Hat-market number = 34.

Agriculture

Agriculture
Total amount of land 23,834 hectares,
Net crop land 16,500 hectares,
Total Crop Land 39,103 hectares,
One crop land 3,015 hectares,
Two crop land 4,367 hectares,
Three crop land 9,118 hectares,
Deep tube well 123,
Non-deep tube well 2,423,
Power driven pump 488,
Blank number 54,
Yearly food demand 782,667 tons,
Number of tube wells 4,276.

Fish
Number of ponds 7,454,
Fishery seed production farm official 01,
Fishery seed production farm is non-governmental 06,
Yearly fisheries demand 6,180 m tons,
Annual fishery production 5,513 tons.

Animal resources
Upazila Animal Medical Center 01,
The number of veterinary doctors 01 people,
Artificial breeding center 01,
Number of points 03,
The number of advanced chicken farms 11.

Layer 800 poultry is upwards of 10-49 chickens, so is the farm Countless. Cattle farm 22,
Broiler chicken farm 96.

Administration
Gafargaon Upazila is divided into Gafargaon Municipality and 15 union parishads: Barobaria, Charalgi, Dotterbazar, Gafargaon, Josora, Longair, Moshakhali, Niguari, Paithol, Panchbagh, Raona, Rasulpur, Saltia, Tangabo, and Usthi. The union parishads are subdivided into 202 mauzas and 214 villages.

Gafargaon Municipality is subdivided into 9 wards and 19 mahallas.

The police stations (thana) are Gafargaon and Pagla. Pagla thana was established in 2012.

Infrastructure

Health and hospitals
Upazila Health Complex 01,
Upazila Health and Family Welfare Center 16,
Number of beds 50,
The number of doctor's given words 37,
Number of working doctors UHC 17, Union level 16, UHPPO 1, total = 34,
Senior Nurse Number 15, people Working = 13 people,
Assistant Nurses Number 01 people.

Family planning
Health and Family Welfare Center 11,
Family planning clinic 01,
M.C.H. The unit 01,
The number of able couples 84,833 people.

Transport
concrete road 147.00 km,
Half way 8.00 km,
Soil road 334 kilometers,
Number of bridges / culvert 466,
Number of rivers 4/.

Education

Gafargaon Islamia Govt. High School
The Gafargaon Islamia Govt . High School is a well known secondary school, established 1906. It is situated at Gafargaon, Bangladesh. The geographical coordinates of Gafargaon Islamia  Govt. High School are 24°27'25.83" North, 90°32'55.4" East.

Some information:

EIIN Code: 111523

Students: Around 2000-2500

Khairullah Govt. Girls  High  School

Another government school at Gafargaon mainly for girls, established 1941. It's situated at Gafargaon, near Shahid Belal Plaza (well known shopping complex). Some useful information:

School Code : 7526

Centre Code: (JSC): 493

(SSC): 296

EIIN Code: 111528

Datter Bazar Union Higher Secondary School

Datter Bazar Union High School is the another well known School in here. In 2012, college department is added with school.

In 2019,  Datter Bazar Union Higher Secondary School gain Highest Rank.
EIIN code: 111553

Beroi Taltola High School
Beroi Taltola High School is one of the oldest schools in Gafargaon Upazila. This school has a marvelous history. Before 2010 it was a girls-only school. 
A famous Hindu woman social worker, Jyoti, established this school in her father's land. It is a fully rural school.

Others

According to Banglapedia, Kandipara Askar Ali High School, founded in 1906, is a notable secondary school.

and beside have Abdur Rahman Degre College.

Number of educational institutions and literacy rate
Government primary school 160,
Non-government primary school 42,
Community Primary School 20,
Junior high school 06,
High school (co-education) 41,
High school (girl) 03,
Dakhil Madrasa 16,
Alim Madrasa 07,
Fazil Madrasa 04,
Kamil Madrasa 2,
College (class) 09,
College (girl) 01,
literacy rate 65%,
Males 68%,
Female 62%

Notable residents

Distinguished people of Gafargaon: Many prominent and noble persons have been born in this upazila. Some of Gafargaon's people were respected by respecting all contemporary leaders.

 Abdul Jabbar, Language Movement martyr, was born at Panchua village in 1919.
 SM Momtaz Uddin, A great 
  freedom fighter and former retired 
  public servant who made a 
  tremendous contributions for this 
  District.He was born in the year 
  1944 at the Village call Tololy.

 Shamsul Huda Panchbagi, Islamic scholar and politician
 Fazlur Rahman Sultan, Member of Parliament
 Muhiuddin Khan, Islamic scholar and Qur'an translator

See also
Upazilas of Bangladesh
Districts of Bangladesh
Divisions of Bangladesh
Narayanganj-Bahadurabad Ghat Line

References

Upazilas of Mymensingh District